The 1928–29 Boston Bruins season was the Bruins' fifth season in the NHL.  Boston defended its American Division title, and went on to defeat the New York Rangers in the Final to become the third American-based team to become Stanley Cup champions.

Offseason 

In the off-season, the Bruins acquired Cy Denneny from the Ottawa Senators, who became a player-coach for the team, taking over from Art Ross, who stepped down to concentrate on his general manager duties.  With the retirement of Hal Winkler, the team also had a new goaltender, rookie Tiny Thompson -- who had spent the 1927–28 season with the Bruins' farm team, the Minneapolis Millers of the AHA -- and a promising new forward, Cooney Weiland, who also had played with Minneapolis. Nobby Clark and the rights to suspended Billy Coutu were sold to New Haven of the Canadian-American League, January 5, 1928. 

The team also moved into a new home, the Boston Madison Square Garden.  The Garden's much larger capacity than the old Boston Arena saw the Bruins' attendance double, to lead the league by a wide margin.

Regular season 

In their debut game at Boston Garden, the Bruins lost 1–0 to the Montreal Canadiens.

Boston got off to a slow start, and through their first 14 games, the Bruins had a record of 5–7–2, tied with the Pittsburgh Pirates.  As the season progressed, Boston made a few trades, acquiring star Mickey MacKay from the Pirates and Bill Carson from the Toronto Maple Leafs.  Lester Patrick and the New York Rangers offered Winthrop native Myles Lane to the Bruins, astonishingly asking for superstar Eddie Shore in return. Bruins' general manager Art Ross replied famously, "You are so many Myles from Shore you need a life preserver."  Nonetheless, the Bruins purchased Lane's rights for $7,500.

Further, Weiland was matched with Dit Clapper and Dutch Gainor on a powerful forward line which garnered the nickname "Dynamite Line," one of the first named forward lines in history.  The Bruins rebounded with a 13-game unbeaten streak, which gave them a 16–7–4 record and suddenly in contention with the New York Rangers for top spot in the American Division.  Boston had a 10–6–1 record in their remaining 17 games, and held off the Rangers to defend their American Division and the Prince of Wales Trophy, finishing with a 26–13–5 mark and a team record 57 points.

Harry Oliver led Boston in scoring, with 17 goals and 23 points.  Dutch Gainor and defenseman Eddie Shore finished just behind Oliver with 19 points, while rookie Cooney Weiland tallied 11 goals and 18 points.  Shore led the club with 96 penalty minutes, while team captain Lionel Hitchman finished with 64 penalty minutes.

In goal, Tiny Thompson had an impressive rookie season, winning 26 games while posting a 1.15 goals against average—both Bruins' records, as well as recording 12 shutouts.  Thompson's 1.15 GAA remains the Bruins' single-season record and is the second lowest ever recorded over a full season in NHL history.

Final standings

Record vs. opponents

Schedule and results

Playoffs 

In the playoffs, Boston had a first round bye, due to finishing on top of the American Division, and faced the Montreal Canadiens, the winners of the Canadian Division, in the semi-finals in a best-of-five series.  The series began with two games at the Boston Garden, and the Bruins, led by Tiny Thompson, won both games by identical 1–0 scores to take a 2–0 series lead.  Game Three shifted to Montreal, and while the Canadiens were able to solve Thompson for two goals, Boston scored three of their own, and swept the series.

In the first Stanley Cup Final exclusively played between American teams, Boston faced their divisional rival – and the team that eliminated them from the playoffs the previous season – the New York Rangers in a best-of-three series.  New York had defeated the Detroit Cougars and the Toronto Maple Leafs to earn a spot in the Final.  Game One was played in Boston, and Thompson again shut the door, as the Bruins won the game 2–0.  Boston completed the two game sweep at Madison Square Garden in New York City, defeating the Rangers 2–1 on March 29 on a goal by Bill Carson, to clinch the first Stanley Cup in team history and making them the third American team to win the Cup championship.

Boston Bruins 3, Montreal Canadiens 0

Boston Bruins 2, New York Rangers 0

Player statistics

Regular season
Scoring

Goaltending

Playoffs
Scoring

Goaltending

Transactions

 Traded Frank Fredrickson to the Pittsburgh Pirates for Mickey MacKay.
 Purchased Bill Carson from Toronto Maple Leafs for $25,000, January 25, 1929.
 Traded Eric Pettinger to Toronto Maple Leafs  with the rights to Hugh Plaxton for the rights to George Owen, January 29, 1929.
 Purchased Myles Lane from New York Rangers for $7,500.

See also
 1928–29 NHL season
 List of Stanley Cup champions

References

Stanley Cup championship seasons
Boston Bruins seasons
Boston
Boston
Boston Bruins
Boston Bruins
1920s in Boston